Choining Dorji is a Bhutanese politician who has been a member of the National Council of Bhutan since May 2018.

References

Members of the National Council (Bhutan)
1970s births
Living people